Puviarasu Muthusamy or Puvi is a Tamil television actor, dancer and national level athlete. He debuted in the seventh season of Maanada Mayilada in 2012 and starred in reality shows, films, short films and other television series. He is best known for playing the lead roles in  serials EMI (2016), Lakshmi Vanthachu (2017), and Azhagiya Tamil Magal (2017), Oru Oorla Oru Rajakumari (2019), Oru Oorla Rendu Rajakumari. Currently, he is playing the lead role in the serial Vidhya No.1

Career
He debuted in the Tamil television dance reality show Maanada Mayilada season 7 in Kalaignar TV along with Anusha and hosted by Sanjeev and Keerthi in 2012. They were 2nd runner up.

In 2013 he participated in the Telugu dance show style. In the finale, he broke his leg in his 2nd performance and left the finale. After this, he started to act in a television serial Keladi Kanmani (2015) in Sun TV. Puvi had a supporting role in Thamarai (2016) serial along with Neelima Rani. He appeared in other Tamil serials such as EMI (2016), Vaani Rani (2016) and Vinnaithaandi Varuvaayaa (2016). He has acted in Aakki,  along with Anu Hassan and Mahendran.

2017–present
In 2017, he appeared in Lakshmi Vanthachu (2017) alongside Vani Bhojan. He participated in the reality risky dance show Dancing Khilladies along with Preetha Suresh. The pair won the contest. The same year, he starred in his first leading role in Zee Tamil serial Azhagiya Tamil Magal serial along with Sheela Rajkumar He participated in Zee Dance League for Azhagiya Tamil Magal. He is participating in Dance Jodi Dance (season 2) along with Pavithra Datta. In between he left from Dance Jodi Dance (season 2) because of his leg fracture. Puvi replaced the role of Iniyan in Vidhya No.1 He is voted has one of the most desirable men on Television 2018 by Times of India. He married Mohanapriya on 22 February 2021.

Television

Television series

Reality shows

Awards and nominations

References 

1988 births
Living people
Tamil male actors
Tamil male television actors
Television personalities from Tamil Nadu
Male actors in Tamil cinema
Male actors from Tamil Nadu
21st-century Tamil male actors
Tamil Reality dancing competition contestants